The 60th Tour de Romandie took place from April 25 through April 30. It is a six-stage cycling tour. It was won by Australian climber Cadel Evans of the  who surprisingly won the final time trial stage and won the Overall Classification despite starting the time trial in the third overall position.

Stage results

Prologue – April 25: Geneva ITT, 3.4km
The stage was a short individual time trial. Pre-Tour favorite, Jan Ullrich, a notable time trialist and Tour de France winner, underperformed; clocking only 4 minutes 53 seconds, almost 30 seconds behind the fastest time of the day.

Stage 1 – April 26: Payerne–Payerne, 169.0km

Stage 2 – April 27: Porrentruy–Porrentruy, 171.2km

Following an early breakaway by Swiss cyclists Roger Beuchat and David Loosli, which lasted for the majority of the stage, they were finally caught at the final climb of the day (less than 20  km from the finish), the 1st Category Col de la Croix; which is particularly steep at some points. On the climb itself a 15-man group which was led by Spaniard Joaquim Rodríguez was quickly formed, including provisional leader Paolo Savoldelli, but excluding General Classement favorites Bradley McGee and Óscar Pereiro.

Following the climb, the descent led by specialist Savoldelli stretched the lead group out even further, and the leaders' group was split into two groups. With 5  km to go the second of the two groups were looking to approach the lead, and 's Christopher Horner used this as a springboard for his own attack, and managed to stay ahead of the chase group to take the stage.

Stage 3 – April 28: Bienne–Leysin, 164.6km

Stage Three featured a relatively flat stage profile until the final 15 km, where the course shifted to a 1st Category climb up to the Swiss mountain resort of Leysin. A breakaway from the peloton after 25 km, led by Wouter Weylandt of the  team, and joined by Jose Redondo Ramos of the Liberty Seguros team gained a quick lead, which expanded to a maximum of 9'20 minutes at around the 100 km mark.

The lead was reduced by the peloton to about three minutes at the start of the final climb of the day. On the climb, Ramos quickly shook off Weylandt, and started up the climb by himself. Several early attacks from out of the peloton were pulled back, but the first which succeeded was by Spanish  climber Óscar Sevilla who quickly opened a lead of several hundred meters. He was shortly followed by 's Dario Cioni, and as the climb entered its steepest final stage, the solo leader Ramos was caught and passed.

A drive from the GC leaders in the group chasing Sevila and Cioni eventually led to the two being pulled in with several kilometer left to go, and as the climb approached the summit 23-year-old Spanish all-rounder Alberto Contador launched an attack up the hill that quickly gained a lead of 20 seconds, which was held until the summit and the finish.

A notable underperformance of the stage was 's Paolo Savoldelli, 2nd in the GC that day, who suffered from diarrhoea and had to stop several times during the stage, and eventually lost 12 minutes on the leaders. Also Overall Leader Christopher Horner and local favorite Alexandre Moos were not able to keep up with the blistering pace on the final climb and both lost over a minute to stage winner Contador.

Stage 4 – April 29: Sion–Sion, 127.7km

Stage 5 – April 30: Lausanne ITT, 20.4km

The stage was an individual time trial. Cadel Evans rode superbly in the last few kilometers, taking the provisional lead, and when General Classement leader Alberto Contador and close GC number 2 Alejandro Valverde both lost more than 50 seconds to Evans, the Australian all-rounder rode to overall victory.

External links
Cyclingnews.com race page

Tour de Romandie
Tour de Romandie
Tour de Romandie